Ushakovo is a rural locality (a village) in Ivanovskoye Rural Settlement, Vashkinsky District, Vologda Oblast, Russia. The population was 14 as of 2002.

Geography 

The distance to Lipin Bor is 57 km, to Ivanovskaya is 2 km. Mytchikovo is the nearest rural locality.

References 

Rural localities in Vashkinsky District